Dzmitry Barysaw (born 8 January 1995) is a Belarusian professional footballer who plays for Smorgon.

Honours
Dinamo Brest
Belarusian Cup winner: 2016–17, 2017–18
Belarusian Super Cup winner: 2018

References

External links 
 
 

1995 births
Living people
Sportspeople from Vitebsk Region
Belarusian footballers
Association football defenders
FC Naftan Novopolotsk players
FC Dynamo Brest players
FC Neman Grodno players
FC Smorgon players